Promoting recovery from conflict is not limited to simply a humanitarian, security or development issue and often involves a combination of all three. Stabilization of fragile states is an approach and a process regarding the fragility and security of said states. Hence, stabilization is an essential concept in relation to fragile and failed states, where basic institutions and services are lacking and where conflict is an influential factor. OECD uses the term from fragility to resilient to describe the process of stabilization.

Stabilization processes are a multisectoral effort, requiring a variety different instruments that seek to secure the basic needs of the population and support the development of state-building to ensure the process is sustainable and builds stronger and more legitimate states These actions are primarily taken by western governments and national actors often involving a combination of military, political, development and humanitarian objectives, resources and activities to tackle transnational and domestic threats through short term security promotion.

Historical logic for international engagement 
Stabilization, as it is currently articulated and implemented by the US and other Western governments, is premised on an assumption that weak governance, instability, violent conflict and associated poverty and underdevelopment pose a direct threat to their strategic interests and international peace and security more broadly. This is because ‘islands of instability’ are seen as constituting sources of regional insecurity and contagion, particularly in their association with international terrorism, transnational crime and other real and existential threats.  While stabilization is firmly rooted in security agendas focused on reducing or eliminating perceived threats, accumulated experience of international intervention and engagement to end conflicts and foster peace and development over the past decade has emphasized the need to integrate military, political, development and humanitarian action. In contexts as diverse as Afghanistan, Haiti and Timor-Leste, stabilization has emerged therefore as a key instrument of a broader liberal, transformative peace-building project. As such, it extends beyond short-term or conservative objectives to eliminate immediate threats or merely to ‘stabilize’ temporarily situations of acute crisis to link action across a range of discrete policy spheres with the aim of reducing violence and establishing the political and social conditions necessary for recovery, reconstruction, development and a lasting peace.

Somalia, a failed state with no functioning government and with most of the country being controlled by insurgents, is an example of stabilization efforts. For fear of Somalia becoming a safe haven for terrorist and thus destabilizing the region and threatening the global society, international actors have engaged through counter-insurgency as a stabilization strategy to remove the insurgents and make Somalia a resilient state for the benefit of Somalis and the international security.

Policy dimensions

Security, development and institutional transformation 
Security and development share a close but complex connection and successful international humanitarian and development stakeholders in fragile states must understand and engage the security issues in areas they operate. Such an understanding has been reached by  donors such as DFID, the United Nations, the European Union and USAID and they have all been involved in security sector reform and efforts to improve justice, from the Democratic Republic of Congo to Liberia, Sierra Leone and Timor-Leste. Yet these efforts have often been limited in their success as a balance security and development is difficult to achieve.  The UK government supported reforms in Sierra Leone along the principle of "security first" over the last decade, which is believed to have improved security, increased access to and the quality of justice, decreased corruption and positively reformed public service. Since the end of the civil war in 2002, there has been no major violence, peaceful elections were held in 2007 and there has been enough stability to help build sustainable institutions. Yet Sierra Leone suffers severe underdevelopment and ranks third to last on the UN Human Development Index for 2010. This in turn has created frustration and disappointment amongst the younger generation and poses a significant risk of a return to violence.

The role of informal actors and the changing nature of violence 
Violence does not end simply with the signing of a peace agreement and often the rates of criminal and domestic violence have actually risen afterwards. Addressing national issues that led to conflict or that might trigger conflict again and efforts to improve the state's own security capacity is only two factors in achieving citizens’ security and social cohesion. The peace process itself may lead to insecurity as demobilisation of armed groups leave armed, social excluded and frustrated individuals free to continue violence informally. Insecurity can be increased by informal actors, as well as regional and international drivers of instability, such as organised crime, drug smuggling and Illegal arms trafficking. Organised crime's capacity to undermine state authority and basic law enforcement is well known in Latin America. In Guatemala, impunity provided as part of the peace process since 1996, following a 30-year civil war, has allowed former members of the state security apparatus in charge of repression new opportunities for criminal activity. Mexico suffers critical levels of drug-related violence that has led to over 10,000 gang killings in 2010, up from just under 6,600 in 2009; the gangs often command more resources than the state. Building state-society relations and trust are central to the process of combating such violence.

The political dimension 
Each state and society emerging from conflict have their own specific interplay of sub-national, national, regional and international drivers of insecurity and effective international engagement in fragile states requires a comprehensive understanding of local politics. Political economy and conflict analysis are increasingly used as a starting point for development and humanitarian strategies. Inclusive political settlements to conflict require agreements to be reached between both elites and their constituencies. This process may be complicated not only by an interest in continuing conflict by particular groups and that the elites may be part of the reason for the conflicts initiative (for instance, by marginalising particular groups in their constituency), but also that key political leaders are necessary to ensure effective dialogue. Stabilisation is not a linear process from conflict to peace and rather represents a lengthy and extensive process that is characterised by power struggles and elite bargaining. Elections and the development of democratic institutions requires a lengthy process for the development of political parties and independent electoral commissions and international community expectations for quick wins or 'ideal' governance reforms must be accordingly tempered.

The process of stabilizing fragile states is often tied with good governance and public service delivery for constituents and international development partners.  Post-conflict states face higher challenges in delivering public service and good governance when compared to non-post-conflict counterparts due to reduced state capacity in reform implementation, the absence of human capital, the presence of donor organizations, and legacy local governing systems. For example, in post-conflict Sierre Leonne, public service delivery bypassed weak civil service institutions through donor-led aid projects in fields such as healthcare delivery.  The resulting formation of parallel mechanisms arrives at the cost of building state capacity and citizen accountability.  Pre-conflict governance structures with traditional or administrative authority, such as the control held by Afghan warlords, historically weaken the delivery of public service and good governance in local regions with a De Jure-De Facto Gap.  Alternatively, well-meaning international attempts to enable good governance can be manipulated by governing regimes to potentially prompt further disorder toward neighbors and citizens.

See also 

 Fragile state
 Fragile States Index
 Rogue state
 Ochlocracy
 Failed state
 Crisis States Research Centre

References

External links 
 Danish Demining Group
 Saferworld

Peace and conflict studies
International development